Dick's Picks Volume 5 is the fifth live album in the Dick's Picks series of releases by the Grateful Dead. It was recorded on December 26, 1979, at the Oakland Auditorium Arena in Oakland, California. It was released in May 1996.

This concert was a benefit for the Seva Foundation, an organization started by Ram Dass and Wavy Gravy.  Bob Weir still sits on the advisory board today.

Volume 5 was the first of the Dick's Picks to contain a complete concert.  It was also the first release of a full concert to feature keyboardist Brent Mydland.

Another Grateful Dead album that was recorded at the December 1979 run of concerts at the Oakland Auditorium is Road Trips Volume 3 Number 1.

Enclosure

Included with the release is a single sheet folded in half, yielding a four-page enclosure.  The front duplicates the cover of the CD and the back contains a black-and-white photograph showing the entire scene: two skeletons on top of the stage, the sound system and lights above the band, the band on stage, and finally, at the bottom of the image, a portion of the crowd watching them.  The two pages inside feature a black-and-white photograph of the band on stage along with lists of the contents of and credits for the release.

Caveat Emptor
Each volume of Dick's Picks has its own "caveat emptor" label, advising the listener of the sound quality of the recording.  The label for Volume 5 reads:

"This compact disc has been digitally remastered directly from the original half track stereo analog tape. It is a snapshot of history, not a modern professional recording, and may therefore exhibit some technical anomalies and the unavoidable effects of the ravages of time."

Track listing

Disc one
First set:
"Cold Rain and Snow" (traditional) – 6:44
"C.C. Rider" (traditional) – 6:43
"Dire Wolf" (Garcia, Hunter) – 3:58
"Me and My Uncle" → (Phillips) – 2:59
"Big River" (Cash) – 5:59
"Brown-Eyed Women" (Garcia, Hunter) – 5:20
"New Minglewood Blues" (traditional) – 7:41
"Friend of the Devil" (Garcia, Dawson, Hunter) – 9:37
"Looks Like Rain" (Weir, Barlow) – 8:14
"Alabama Getaway" → (Garcia, Hunter) – 6:58
"Promised Land" (Berry) – 4:26

Disc two
Second set:
"Uncle John's Band" → (Garcia, Hunter) – 10:14
"Estimated Prophet" → (Barlow, Weir) – 14:11
"Jam" → (Grateful Dead) – 6:01
"He's Gone" → (Garcia, Hunter) – 10:03
"The Other One" → (Weir, Kreutzmann) – 8:38
"Drums" → (Hart, Kreutzmann) – 6:03

Disc three
"Drums" → (Hart, Kreutzmann) – 4:22
"Jam" → (Grateful Dead) – 6:03
"Not Fade Away" → (Petty, Hardin) – 11:52
"Brokedown Palace" → (Garcia, Hunter) – 4:49
"Around and Around" → (Berry) – 3:57
"Johnny B. Goode" (Berry) – 4:28
Encore:
"Shakedown Street" → (Garcia, Hunter) – 13:52
"Uncle John's Band" (Garcia, Hunter) – 2:54

Personnel

Grateful Dead
Jerry Garcia - lead guitar, vocals
Mickey Hart - drums
Bill Kreutzmann - drums
Phil Lesh - electric bass
Brent Mydland - keyboards, vocals
Bob Weir - guitar, vocals

Production
Betty Cantor-Jackson - recording
Dick Latvala - tape archivist
Jeffrey Norman - CD mastering
Jay Blakesberg - photo
Gecko Graphics - design

References

05
1996 live albums